Lolly Pop is an on-stage persona of Brooke R. Calder, produced by Ricardo Autobahn, Monte Moir and Doctor Fink.

Biography
Raised between the United States and Zimbabwe, Africa, Calder moved to Minneapolis, Minnesota to work as a dancer for Prince in 1994. Shortly after being cast in the New Power Generation (NPG)'s "Get Wild" video, she suffered a debilitating back injury but was offered a studio apprenticeship with NPG keyboardist Morris Hayes. Following completion, she served as a label intern with Twin/Tone Records, where she worked for related acts of Information Society (band), The Suburbs (band), Semisonic and more. 

Circa 2002, Calder adopted the moniker Lolly Pop and formed Electro-Kitsch act TELEPHONE!.  In 2006, Pop emerged as a solo artist produced by Fink, Moir and Autobahn. The following year, she was featured on RockAmerica, the soundtrack of the film Loveless in Los Angeles, appeared at Winter Music Conference in Miami, and in the Paul Moering short film Climbing Trees.

Next recruited as the female vocalist for POP INC., she also contributed vocals to and/or produced American acts A*O*A and glean (with Rick McCollum of The Afghan Whigs); British outfits Cuban Boys and The Rude Awakening, as well as Norway's Frode Holm.  With The Rembrandts' Phil Solem, Calder co-wrote the theme song for the Launch TV comedy Graham Crackers. In 2019, she had a cameo appearance in Jellybean Johnson's Put Some Jelly On It and formed dark wave duo The Red Hour.  She most recently collaborated with BBC award-winning director Martin Gooch for the short film "Everybody Loves Dancing", runs Philadelphia-based imprint Manual Control Records and is working on her seventeenth release.

Charitable efforts
During 2019, Calder helmed a suitcase and donations initiative for survivors of the Drake fire. Throughout 2017, A*O*A donated their sales profits to the NODAPL Legal Fund and continue to provide a $1 royalty to RAICES for each maxi-single sold. In 2004, Calder organized an all-female-fronted bill (GIRLFEST '04) and teamed up with First Avenue (nightclub) to raise money for the Tubman Alliance.

Discography
2000: BURNING SHAKESPEARE - No Juliet EP - Self Released
2000: THOUSAND VOID CRUSH f. BURNING SHAKESPEARE - "Radio Free" - Sursumcorda Records
2001: BROWN RAINBOW - Underground Soundtracks (Various tracks) - Self Released
2002: TELEPHONE! - Love... EP - Self Released
2003: TELEPHONE! - *69 EP - Self Released
2003: CHUCK LOVE - Continuous (Song: "Perfect") - Om Records
2004: TC ELECTROPUNK VOLUME 1 (Song: "Life on Hold")
2004: DORY/1DJ - 8Bits (song: "Encore") - Self Released
2005: TC ELECTROPUNK VOLUME 2 (Song: "Elevator Operator")
2005: SUNNY SMACK - Mezzanine Girls (Song: "Mezzanine") - Self Released
2006: THE CUBAN BOYS - Satellite Junkyard (Song: "Claudine Is Blue") - Banoffeesound
2006: THE CUBAN BOYS - BBC Radio [live] (Song: "Walking In The Air") - Banoffeesound
2007: LOLLY POP - Elevator Operator (Danny Morris remix video) - Rockamerica
2007: LOLLY POP - Elevator Operator (Digital maxi single) - Modo Disco (UK)
2007: LOLLY POP (Self-titled debut and remixes) - Modo Disco (UK)
2008: THE PLASTIC CONSTELLATIONS - We Appreciate You (Songs: "Stay That Way", "So Many Friends") - Longtime Listener
2009: POP INC. - "Looking 4 The KLF" (Video - original edit and download card/maxi single) - Modo Disco (UK) / Rockamerica
2009: TC ELECTROPUNK VOLUME 5 (Song: POP INC. - "Disenchanted")
2010: ANDRA - "Love Is 4 Suckaz" Mixtape (Song: Models & Bottles) - Krucial Noize/Kerry Brothers Jr 
2010: POP INC. vs. SYMPHONO - "Looking 4 The KLF" (Single) - Ninthwave Records
2011: POP INC. - "BLVD (Boulevard of Broken Dreams)" (Video/DVD, digital maxi single)
2012: TC ELECTROPUNK VOLUME 6 (Song: POP INC. - "Hollywood Kills")
2014: glean - Echoes & Waves (EP)
2014: GRAHAM CRACKERS THEME SONG - "Steady On (True Blue)" featuring Phil Solem
2015: glean - Shadows & Sand (EP)
2016: A*O*A - "I'm Afraid of Americans" (Digital single)
2017: AIDAN CASSERLY - Spoken (Song: "April 21st")
2017: THE RUDE AWAKENING - "Pride" - Electro London
2017: LOLLY POP - LINGERIE: Lost Remixes & Bonus Tracks - Banoffeesound Records
2018: A*O*A - "I'm Afraid of Americans" (Remixes)
2019: FRODE HOLM - Third (Engineer, Vocal Producer, Backing Vocals)
2021: THE RED HOUR - "Cracks" - Manual Control Records
2022: BROOKE R. CALDER - "Everybody Loves Dancing" (Video and Digital Single) - Manual Control Records
2023: BURNING SHAKESPEARE - RADIO-FREE EP (Digital Reissue)- Manual Control Records - In Pre-sale
2023: BROOKE R. CALDER - "Everybody Loves Dancing" (Remixes) - Manual Control Records - TBA
2023: POP INC. - Best Of - Manual Control Records - In Production

References

Additional sources:
 City Pages Magazine, February 14, 2007 
 Rift Magazine, February 2007 
 Star Tribune, February 9, 2007 
 St. Paul Pioneer Press July 27, 2006 
 Rift Magazine, November 2005 
 Star Tribune, March 18, 2005 
 City Pages, May 25, 2005 
 Stone Roller Magazine, May 2004

External links
 - Official Site 01
 - Official Site 02
 - Official Site 03
 - Official Site 04

Living people
American women pop singers
American women in electronic music
1975 births
21st-century American singers
21st-century American women singers